The Narragansett Bay National Estuarine Research Reserve is a Marine Protected Area of the United States located  on Prudence, Patience, and Hope islands in Narragansett Bay in the state of Rhode Island.

It was established in August 1980 under the Coastal Zone Management Act. 
During the colonial era, all three islands were used for farming. By the 20th century, farming had declined and Prudence Island began to attract summer residents. During World War II, the U.S. military established a presence on the island and remained until 1972, when the land was turned over to the state of Rhode Island.

It encompasses coastal, estuarine, and tidal habitats.

The reserve is managed by the Rhode Island Department of Environmental Management as a federal/state partnership in cooperation with NOAA.

See also

National Estuarine Research Reserve

External links
Images at NOAA
Narragansett Bay Research Reserve
National Estuarine Research Reserve System
 MPA information site
Reserve Profile

Narragansett Bay
Nature reserves in Rhode Island
National Estuarine Research Reserves of the United States
Protected areas of Newport County, Rhode Island
Nature centers in Rhode Island
Protected areas established in 1980
1980 establishments in Rhode Island